Miroslav Ivanov (born 9 November 1981 in Gabrovo) is a former Bulgarian footballer who played as a midfielder.

Career

Beginning
He began his career in his hometown as player of Yantra Gabrovo. Then he was transferred to FC Shumen.

Levski Sofia
He signed for Levski Sofia in early 2005. During the second part of 2004/2005 season he was used mainly as a substitute and he made 8 appearances, scoring 2 goals (for the 2-1 victory over Bulgarian side PFC Cherno More Varna in a match played on Georgi Asparuhov Stadium). In 2005/2006 season he took part in 19 games, scoring 1 goal. He scored a goal against the Dutch side SC Heerenveen in UEFA Cup match during 2005/2006 season (Levski lost 1-2). In the beginning of the 2006/2007 season he again is a rare starter. He became a Champion of Bulgaria in 2009.

PFC Montana
On 30 June 2009, just a day before his contract expired, Ivanov was sold to PFC Montana.

Ludogorets Razgrad
In February 2011, Ivanov signed a contract with Ludogorets Razgrad. He established himself as first choice under manager Ivaylo Petev during Ludogorets' maiden season in the A PFG. On 23 May 2012, in the last league match of the season Ivanov scored the only goal in the 1:0 win over CSKA Sofia from a free kick, which enabled the team from Razgrad to claim the first A PFG title in its history.

Honours 
Levski Sofia
 A PFG: 2005-06, 2006–07, 2008–09
 Bulgarian Cup: 2004-05, 2006–07
 Bulgarian Supercup: 2005, 2007
Ludogorets Razgrad
 Bulgarian A PFG: 2011-12, 2012–13
 Bulgarian Cup: 2012
 Bulgarian Supercup 2012

References

External links 
 Official player website from LEVSKI2000
 
 Profile at Levskisofia.info 

1981 births
Living people
Bulgarian footballers
Association football midfielders
First Professional Football League (Bulgaria) players
FC Yantra Gabrovo players
PFC Levski Sofia players
FC Montana players
PFC Ludogorets Razgrad players
FC Lokomotiv Gorna Oryahovitsa players
SFC Etar Veliko Tarnovo players
People from Gabrovo